The Paraguay men's national under-18 basketball team is a national basketball team of Paraguay, governed by the Confederación Paraguaya de Basquetbol.

It represents the country in international under-18 (under age 18) basketball competitions.

Its last appearance was at the 2004 South American Championship for Cadets.

See also
Paraguay men's national basketball team
Paraguay men's national under-17 basketball team
Paraguay women's national under-18 basketball team

References

External links
 Archived records of Paraguay team participations

Basketball teams in Paraguay
Men's national under-18 basketball teams
Basketball